The 1980 Brown Bears football team was an American football team that represented Brown University during the 1980 NCAA Division I-A football season. Brown tied for third place in the Ivy League. 

In their sixth season under head coach John Anderson, the Bears compiled a 6–4 record and outscored opponents 240 to 195. Larry Carbone and John Woodring were the team captains. 

The Bears' 4–3 conference record earned them part of a four-way tie  third place in the Ivy League standings. They outscored Ivy opponents 190 to 161. 

Ivy League football teams expanded their schedules to 10 games in 1980, making this the first year since 1955 that Brown played three games against non-Ivy opponents.

Brown played its home games at Brown Stadium in Providence, Rhode Island.

Schedule

Roster

References

Brown
Brown Bears football seasons
Brown Bears football